The following is a chronology of notable events from the year 2023 in Bolivia.

Incumbents

National government 
 President: Luis Arce (MAS)
 Vice President: David Choquehuanca (MAS)
 President of the Supreme Tribunal of Justice: Ricardo Torres
 President of the Supreme Electoral Tribunal: Oscar Hassenteufel
 President of the Plurinational Constitutional Tribunal: Paul Franco
 President of the Senate: Andrónico Rodríguez (MAS)
 President of the Chamber of Deputies: Jerges Mercado (PCB)
 Assembly: 3rd

Events by month

January 
 1 January
 Sustained protests in Santa Cruz over the arrest of Governor Luis Fernando Camacho continue into the new year. Demonstrators clash with police in the vicinity of the Cristo Redentor monument, while stray fires char portions of government facilities. In an attempt to quell the unrest, Police Command shuts down traffic across the second ring of the city and begins limiting freedom of movement for local residents, who are pressured to stay in their homes under threat of tear gas. In response to police repression, solidarity protests spring up across the country, including in Sucre. In other departments, local civic organizations begin plans to organize their own demonstrations, while in La Paz, the National Committee for the Defense of Democracy announces preparations for nationwide mobilizations against police brutality.
 Criminal justice authorities register the first two incidents of femicide in the country. The first occurred in Tarija in the early hours of the morning, while a second incident took place at approximately 3:50p.m. in the small community of Choreti, near Camiri.
 President Luis Arce travels to Brazil to attend the inauguration of Luiz Inácio Lula da Silva. There, he also meets with members of Russia's Federal Council to discuss increasing bilateral relations in the fields of commerce, energy, and technology.

 2 January
 Protests rage on in Santa Cruz as demonstrators clash with police for the sixth night in a row. In the provinces, protesters install new and reinforce existing blockades along roads and highways, including those connecting the region to other departments. Interdepartmental commerce is paralyzed as Santa Cruz's largest meat and grain companies terminate the sale of produce to the interior. Elsewhere in the country, new protests against police repression and in support of Camacho spring up in Cochabamba, La Paz, and Tarija and continue in Sucre.
 From prison, Camacho suffers significant health decompensation, including partial muscle and nerve paralysis. A hearing on whether the governor should be transferred to a hospital is opened at the Eighth Criminal Sentencing Court of Santa Cruz but is quickly suspended after the judge declines jurisdiction at the request of the Prosecutor's Office.

 3 January
 As protests continue in Santa Cruz, civic leaders announce a shift in strategy, imploring demonstrators to block the transfer of any and all local resources to the central government. Multiple ranchers' associations in both Santa Cruz and neighboring Beni initiate boycotts, closing off the transport of grains and food to the rest of the country.
 At separate ceremonies in Sucre, the Supreme Tribunal of Justice and Plurinational Constitutional Court inaugurate the legal year, while at a third event in the city, magistrate Tereza Garrón is sworn in as president of the Agro-environmental Tribunal.
 After over half a year in preventative detention, Max Mendoza, a former student leader accused of corruption, is released from San Pedro prison on house arrest and his bail is set at Bs40,000. The Prosecutor's Office, Attorney General's Office, and the Higher University of San Andrés all announce their intent to appeal the decision.

 4 January
 At an emergency meeting in Santa Cruz, civic associations from multiple departments issue a call for nationwide protest measures. In response, the Bolivian Workers' Center declares itself in a state of emergency and announces the scheduling of meetings with other pro-government groups regarding possible counter-protests.
 Foreign deputies Victor González of the Spanish Vox party and Fernando Sánchez of the Chilean Republican Party, who had previously arrived in Santa Cruz to advocate the release of Camacho, are expelled from the country by the national government. The Foreign Ministry denounced that the two parliamentarians had been acting as a diplomatic mission despite a lack of authorization from their respective legislatures. An official complaint rejecting the two parliamentarians' "meddling in Bolivia's internal political affairs" is delivered to the Chilean and Spanish embassies.
 In the United States, former minister of government Arturo Murillo is sentenced to seventy months in prison for the crimes of bribery and money laundering. As part of a plea deal reached the preceding October, in which he waived the right to appeal, Murillo's sentence was reduced from twenty years. From Bolivia, Attorney General Wilfredo Chávez announces the government's intent to request Murillo's extradition back to the country once his sentence in the US is fulfilled.

 5 January
 Following an investigation into Camacho's financial dealings during the 2019 crisis, government prosecutor's amplify the existing suit against the governor, levying charges of bribery and seduction of troops.
 In Peru, Congressman Jorge Montoya of the ultra-conservative Popular Renewal party files a criminal suit against former president Evo Morales for the alleged crime of "attacking [the country's] national integrity." During the presidency of Pedro Castillo, Morales had been active in the country's southern regions, promoting the integration its indigenous peoples into RUNASUR, a regional non-governmental organization.

 6 January
 After a five-hour meeting with President Arce at the Casa Grande del Pueblo, members of the Pact of Unity—a consortium of the country's largest trade unions and social organizations—declared themselves in a state of emergency and announce the initiation of mass mobilizations in all nine departments starting on 9 January.
Imprisoned former president Jeanine Áñez receives an added four months of preventative detention as part of an investigation into the irregular appointment of public officials in the Bolivian Food Company.
 Members of Chuquisaca's Departmental Federation of Neighborhood Councils initiate protests in Sucre against an increase in bus fares imposed by the San Cristóbal Bus Union.
Following an appeal by the Prosecutor's Office, Judge Jorge Pérez of the Third Criminal Court of Potosí orders house arrest for Governor Jhonny Mamani as part of an investigation into the corrupt purchase of forty-one ambulances. The decision overturns a lower court ruling in December that granted Mamani unrestricted freedom of movement.
 Amid controversy surrounding Morales's political activism in Peru, President Dina Boluarte withdraws her country's ambassador to Bolivia.

 9 January
 Protesters in Santa Cruz enter their second consecutive week of marches, vigils, and roadblocks in opposition to the arrest of Camacho.
 The Ministry of the Interior of Peru barres nine Bolivian nationals, including Morales and several former vice ministers, from entering the country.
 Wilfredo Gutiérrez is sworn in as vice minister of transport, replacing Israel Ticona.
 In racquetball, Conrrado Moscoso of Chuquisaca becomes the number one global ranking player of the International Racquetball Tour, displacing Mexico's Daniel de la Rosa.

Deaths 

 9 January – Martín Alipaz, 57, photojournalist (b. 1966)

References

External links 
 

2023 in Bolivia
2020s in Bolivia
Bolivia
Bolivia
Years of the 21st century in Bolivia